Germano Pierdomenico (born 12 June 1967) is an Italian former professional racing cyclist.

Major results

1989
 1st Coppa Fiera di Mercatale
1991
 3rd Giro della Provincia di Reggio Calabria
 1992
 1st Stage 1 Grand Prix Guillaume Tell
1995
 1st Stage 13 Herald Sun Tour
1996
 6th GP Ouest–France
1997
 3rd Route Adélie
 9th Overall Giro di Sardegna
1998
 2nd Brabantse Pijl
 2nd Giro di Romagna
 3rd GP Chiasso
 6th Amstel Gold Race
 6th Overall Tirreno–Adriatico
 9th Paris–Bruxelles

Grand Tour general classification results timeline

References

1967 births
Living people
Italian male cyclists
Sportspeople from the Province of Chieti
Cyclists from Abruzzo